KSGT (1340 AM) is a radio station licensed to Jackson, Wyoming, United States. The station is owned by Scott Anderson, through licensee Jackson Hole Radio, LLC. .

References

External links
 Official Website
 
 
 

SGT
Spanish-language radio stations in the United States
Contemporary hit radio stations in the United States
Radio stations established in 1962
1962 establishments in Wyoming